The Flylight E-Dragon is a British electric ultralight trike, designed by Ben Ashman and prototyped by Flylight Airsports of Northamptonshire. The aircraft was under development in 2011.

Design and development
The aircraft was developed from the Flylight Dragonfly single place, retractable landing gear trike. The E-Dragon features a cable-braced hang glider-style high-wing, weight-shift controls, a single-seat open cockpit without a cockpit fairing, retractable tricycle landing gear and a single electric motor in pusher configuration.

The aircraft is made from bolted-together aluminum tubing, with its double surface wing covered in Dacron sailcloth. Its  span wing is supported by a single tube-type kingpost and uses an "A" frame weight-shift control bar. The powerplant is a  Geiger HP Direct 10 electric motor powering a folding  propeller. The power source is a 2.6 kWh Lithium ion battery, which provides a normal flight duration of 30 minutes or 15 minutes at full power.

The prototype used an Aeros Discus wing.

Specifications (E-Dragon)

References

External links
Photo of the E-Dragon prototype

2010s British sport aircraft
2010s British ultralight aircraft
Single-engined pusher aircraft
Ultralight trikes
Electric aircraft